Isthmocoris is a genus of big-eyed bugs in the family Geocoridae. There are at least four described species in Isthmocoris.

Species
These four species belong to the genus Isthmocoris:
 Isthmocoris imperialis (Distant, 1893)
 Isthmocoris piceus (Say, 1831) - type species (as Salda picea Say)
 Isthmocoris slevini (Van Duzee, 1928)
 Isthmocoris tristis (Stal, 1854)

References

Lygaeoidea
Articles created by Qbugbot